Ryan North (born October 20, 1980) is a Canadian writer and computer programmer.

He is the creator and author of Dinosaur Comics, and has written for the comic series of Adventure Time and Marvel Comics' The Unbeatable Squirrel Girl. His works have won multiple Eisner Awards and Harvey Awards and made New York Times Bestseller lists.

Comics

Webcomics 

North started the webcomic Dinosaur Comics in 2003, during the last year of his undergraduate degree. Dinosaur Comics is a fixed-art webcomic which uses the same base art for every strip.  North has produced over 3,500 strips.

Dinosaur Comics was named one of the best webcomics of 2004 and 2005 by The Webcomics Examiner. Wired listed Dinosaur Comics as one of "Five Webcomics You Can Share With Your Kids" and PC Magazine included the comic in its "10 Wicked Awesome Webcomics" list. Cracked.com named Dinosaur Comics one of the 8 funniest webcomics on the internet. In 2005, it won "Outstanding Anthropomorphic Comic" in the Web Cartoonists' Choice Awards.

As well as Dinosaur Comics, North also created Whispered Apologies, a site where users could submit comic art without text and others would write text to match the art.

Canada's The Globe and Mail described North as a "pioneering webcomic creator".

Printed comics and graphic novels 
North was the writer of the Adventure Time comic book series from 2012 to 2014. In 2013 the series won an Eisner Award (Best Publication for Kids) and a Harvey Award (Best Original Graphic Publication For Younger Readers).

North has written for several Marvel Comics series, including The Unbeatable Squirrel Girl, Power Pack, and Inhumans: Once and Future Kings.

On January 21, 2013, Shiftylook.com launched Galaga, a comic written by North and illustrated by Christopher Hastings and colored by Anthony Clark, the creators of The Adventures of Dr. McNinja. The comic is based on the 1981 arcade shooter of the same name.

On July 21, 2017, two of North's projects were awarded Eisner Awards: "Best Publication for Teens (ages 13-17)" for The Unbeatable Squirrel Girl (with Erica Henderson), and "Best Humor Publication" for Jughead (with Chip Zdarsky, Henderson, and Derek Charm).

On September 15, 2020, Archaia published a graphic novel adaptation of Kurt Vonnegut's Slaughterhouse-Five, which was adapted by North and illustrated by Albert Monteys.

In July 2022, North announced two upcoming comics projects via his newsletter. The first is Star Trek: Lower Decks —a limited series based on the animated series of the same name—with artist Chris Fenoglio; the first issue is scheduled to be published in September 2022 by IDW Publishing. The second is a YA graphic novel, titled Danger and Other Unknown Risks, with artist Henderson; North and Henderson were co-creators on Squirrel Girl. This graphic novel is described as a "dystopian fantasy" and is scheduled to be published in April 2023 by Penguin Teen.

In November 2022, North launched a new volume of Fantastic Four with artist Iban Coello.

Webcomic tools 
North created three tools to aid webcomic authors: Oh No Robot, a webcomic transcription tool that creates searchable text databases for comics; RSSpect, a method of creating RSS feeds for websites; and Project Wonderful, a pay-per-day auction-based ad serving system. The first two were free, whereas the last took 25% of each sale. Only Oh No Robot remains.

Books and other writing 
During his academic career, North co-authored three papers on computational linguistics.

Some of North's original comedy writing appears on the website Madhouse, including Robot Erotica, and prank emails such as attempts to stop other people named "Ryan North" from using his name. 

In November 2006, Ryan North created the site Every Topic in the Universe Except Chickens, which purports to provide a solution to vandalism on Wikipedia, in that it encourages vandals to vandalize only the article on chickens: "...instead of vandalizing Wikipedia in general, we all just vandalize the chicken article." North reasoned that it was worth trading the reliability of the chicken article if it meant freeing the rest of the encyclopedia from the threat of vandalism because "Dudes already know about chickens." The site received media attention.

A collection of short stories titled Machine of Death was released October 2010 through Bearstache Books. The book, featuring stories and illustrations by various authors and artists, was based on a Dinosaur Comics comic by North of December 5, 2005, with the premise of a machine that predicts the manner of a person's death accurately but in a difficult to understand manner. North was one of its editors, and contributed one of the stories. Machine of Death reached #1 on Amazon.com, beating Glenn Beck and drawing criticism from him as exemplifying a "liberal culture of death".

In November 2012, North launched a Kickstarter project to fund a book entitled To Be or Not to Be: That Is the Adventure, a retelling of Shakespeare's Hamlet modelled on Choose Your Own Adventure novels. The project raised more than six times its $20,000 goal in less than a week, and closed on December 22, 2012 having raised $580,905, nearly thirty times their original goal, and a record for a Kickstarter publishing project at that time. The book allows readers to take the role of Hamlet, Ophelia or Hamlet's father and make their own choices throughout the story; the latter characters, as well as over 100 colour illustrations by a range of artists, were added to the book as funding increased. The book made a New York Times Bestseller list. In 2016, Ryan published a similar book titled Romeo and/or Juliet. There are 46,012,475,909,287,476 possible adventures in it.   The book received generally positive coverage.

In 2018, Riverhead Books published Ryan North's How To Invent Everything: A Survival Guide for the Stranded Time Traveller, a nonfiction guide to technology based around the fictional premise of a time machine stranding the reader in the past. It was named one of NPR's and BBC Science Focus's Best Books of 2018.

In 2019, North helped develop the story and writing for an iOS game app called AVO! by Playdeo Limited 

North wrote the 2021 action-adventure video game Lost in Random, published by Electronic Arts.

In April 2022, North was the writer for the six-episode podcast series Marvel's Squirrel Girl: The Unbeatable Radio Show which is a direct continuation of the comic series he wrote; the series is produced by Radio Point, directed by Giovanna Sardelli and stars Milana Vayntrub as Squirrel Girl.

Awards 

|-
| rowspan=4|2017
| The Unbeatable Squirrel Girl
| Eisner Award: Best Publication for Teens (ages 13–17)
| 
| Illustrated by Erica Henderson
|-
| Jughead
| Eisner Award: Best Humor Publication
| 
| Created by Chip Zdarsky, North, Erica Henderson, and Derek Charm
|-
| Romeo and/or Juliet: A Choosable-Path Adventure
| Alex Award
| 
| 
|-
| (multiple comics)
| Joe Shuster Award: Outstanding Writer
| 
| 
|-
| rowspan=2|2016
| The Unbeatable Squirrel Girl
| Eisner Award: Best New Series
| 
| Illustrated by Erica Henderson
|-
| (multiple comics)
| Joe Shuster Award: Outstanding Writer
| 
| 
|-
| rowspan=2|2015
| (multiple comics)
| Joe Shuster Award: Outstanding Writer
| 
| 
|-
| The Midas Flesh
| Joe Shuster Award: The Dragon Award (Comics for Kids)
| 
| 
|-
| rowspan=3|2014
| Adventure Time
| Harvey Awards: Best Original Graphic Publication for Younger Readers
| 
| 
|-
| Adventure Time
| Harvey Awards: Special Award for Humor
| 
| 
|-
| (multiple comics)
| Joe Shuster Award: Outstanding Writer
| 
| 
|-
| rowspan=6|2013
| Adventure Time
| Eisner Award: Best Publication for Kids (ages 8–12)
| 
| 
|-
| Adventure Time
| Harvey Awards: Best Original Graphic Publication for Younger Readers
| 
| 
|-
| Adventure Time
| Harvey Awards: Special Award for Humor
| 
| 
|-
| Adventure Time
| Eisner Award: Best New Series
| 
| 
|-
| Adventure Time
| Eisner Award: Best Humor Publication
| 
| 
|-
| Adventure Time
| Sushter Awards: Outstanding Writer
| 
| 
|-
| 2005
| Dinosaur Comics
| Web Cartoonists' Choice Awards: Outstanding Anthropomorphic Comic
| 
| In the same year, Dinosaur Comics was also nominated for Outstanding Writing, Outstanding Comedic Comic, and Outstanding Short Form Comic.

Personal life
North was born in Osgoode, Ontario, in 1980. His parents are Anna and Randall North and said in an interview that he has a younger brother, Victor. In an interview, North said that his family lived in rural Osgoode and there was not a lot to do, so spent much of his time on the computer. After high school, he studied computer science at Carleton University in Ottawa, then did his master's degree in computer science at the University of Toronto in Toronto, specializing in computational linguistics. 

North once hosted instructions on his website for building cardboard boxes designed to look like elements of Super Mario Brothers, designed by his friend Posterchild. In 2006, a group of teenage girls in Ravenna, Ohio were arrested after they created and distributed several of these blocks, over fears they were bombs.

On August 18, 2015, North became stuck in a skate pit with only an umbrella, a leash, his phone, and his dog, Noam Chompsky, after rain made the surface too slick to easily climb with a dog in tow. He posted about his conundrum on Twitter, leading hundreds of Twitter users to reply with suggestions on how to combine the items in his "inventory" to escape, eventually leading to success.

North is married to his wife Jenn Klug. As of 2016, they lived in Leslieville, Toronto, Ontario.

Bibliography
 Author, The Best of Dinosaur Comics: 2003-2005 AD (April 15, 2006, Quack!Media) 
 Author, Dinosaur Comics: Dudes Already Know About Chickens (2010, TopatoCo) 
 Editor and contributor, Machine of Death: A Collection of Stories About People Who Know How They Will Die (October 13, 2010, Machines of Death) 
 Author, Everybody Knows Failure Is Just Success Rounded Down: Dinosaur Comics (2011, TopatoCo) 
Writer, Adventure Time Issues 1-35 (2012-15,  KaBOOM!)
 Author, To Be or Not to Be: That Is the Adventure (2013, Breadpig) 
 Editor,  This Is How You Die; Stories of the Inscrutable, Infallible, Inescapable Machine of Death (2013, Grand Central Publishing) 
 Author, The Midas Flesh Vol. 1 (2014, BOOM! Box) 
 Author, The Midas Flesh Vol. 2 (2015, BOOM! Box) 
 Writer, The Unbeatable Squirrel Girl Vol. 1 Issues 1-8 (2015, Marvel)
 Writer, The Unbeatable Squirrel Girl Vol. 2 Issues 1-50 (2015-2019, Marvel)
 Author, Romeo and/or Juliet: A Chooseable-Path Adventure (2016, Riverhead Books) 
 Writer, Jughead Volume 2, Issues 9-11 (2017, Archie Comics) 
 Writer, Jughead Volume 3, Issues 12-14 (2017, Archie Comics) 
 Author, How to Be a T.Rex (2018, Dial Books) 
 Author, How To Invent Everything: A Survival Guide For The Stranded Time Traveler (2018, Riverhead Books) 
 Author, Slaughterhouse-Five: The Graphic Novel (2020,  Archaia) 
 Author, How to Take Over the World: Practical Schemes and Scientific Solutions for the Aspiring Supervillain (2022, Riverhead Books)

References

External links

 Dinosaur Comics
 Whispered Apologies
 Truth and Beauty Bombs 
 Ryan North's LiveJournal
 The Amazing Regret Index
 Ryan North at University of Toronto
 ProjectWonderful
 Every Topic in the Universe Except Chickens
 Carleton University alumni profile
 Oh No Robot
 RSSpect

1980 births
Artists from Ottawa
Canadian cartoonists
Canadian comics writers
Canadian computer programmers
Canadian humorists
Canadian Internet celebrities
Canadian webcomic creators
Carleton University alumni
Eisner Award winners
Free software programmers
Living people
University of Toronto alumni
Web Cartoonists' Choice Award winners
Writers from Ottawa